Wills Creek is an unincorporated community in Coshocton County, in the U.S. state of Ohio.

History
Wills Creek had its start when Frew's Mill was built there. The community took its name from nearby Wills Creek. A post office was established at Wills Creek in 1840, and was discontinued in 1904.

References

Unincorporated communities in Coshocton County, Ohio
Unincorporated communities in Ohio